European route E 903 is a European B class road in Spain, connecting the city Mérida – Alicante.

Route 
 
: Mérida - Ciudad Real
: Ciudad Real - Manzanares - Atalaya del Cañavate
: Atalaya del Cañavate - Albacete - Alicante

External links 
 UN Economic Commission for Europe: Overall Map of E-road Network (2007)
 International E-road network

International E-road network